The Kinsman is a 1919 British silent comedy film directed by Henry Edwards and starring Edwards, James Carew and Chrissie White.

Plot summary
A cockney clerk switches places with an aristocrat to whom he is identical.

Cast
 Henry Edwards - Bert Gammage/Roger Blois
 James Carew - Col. Blois
 Chrissie White - Pamela Blois
 Christine Rayner - Julie
 Gwynne Herbert - Mrs. Blois
 Victor Prout - Col. Lorraine
 John MacAndrews - Dobbs
 Judd Green - Dr. Sprott
 Marie Wright - Duchess
 Bob Russell - Footman

References

External links

1919 films
British silent feature films
1919 comedy films
Films directed by Henry Edwards
British comedy films
British black-and-white films
Hepworth Pictures films
1910s English-language films
1910s British films
Silent comedy films